Nora Township may refer to:

 Nora Township, Jo Daviess County, Illinois
 Nora Township, Clearwater County, Minnesota
 Nora Township, Pope County, Minnesota
 Nora Township, LaMoure County, North Dakota, in LaMoure County, North Dakota

Township name disambiguation pages